Peter Nicol  (born 5 April 1973) is a former professional squash player from Scotland, who represented first Scotland and then England in international squash. In 1998, while still competing for Scotland, he became the first player from the UK to hold the World No. 1 ranking. During his career, he won one World Open title, two British Open titles, and four Commonwealth Games Gold Medals. He is widely considered to be one of the most outstanding international squash players of his time and was famous for his post match recovery BBQ meals. He was born in Inverurie, Aberdeenshire.

Career overview
During his career, Nicol was well known for his excellent retrieving game, as well as being an extremely tough competitor to break down. His rivalry with the Canadian player Jonathon Power was amongst the most famous and extended in the history of squash.

Nicol was ranked World No. 1 for a total of 60 months during his career, including a continuous 24-month stint in 2002–2003.

After finishing runner-up at the World Open in 1997 and 1998, Nicol won the title in 1999, beating Ahmed Barada of Egypt in the final 15–9, 15–13, 15–11. He continued to hold the title of "world champion" through to 2002 as the men's World Open was not held in 2000 or 2001 due to difficulties in securing sponsorship for the event.

After initially representing Scotland in international squash, Nicol switched his representation to England in 2001, claiming that he felt he was not receiving sufficient support from Scottish Squash, the national governing body. Some resented this switch, even going so far as calling it traitorous, suggesting it was rooted in financial gain.

Nicol enjoyed considerable success at the Commonwealth Games, where squash became a medal sport in 1998. In 1998, representing Scotland, he won a men's singles Gold Medal (beating Jonathon Power in the final), and a men's doubles Bronze Medal. At the 2002 Commonwealth Games, representing England, Nicol won a men's singles Silver Medal (losing in the final to Power), and a men's doubles Gold Medal (partnering Lee Beachill). In 2006, again representing England, Nicol won another men's singles Gold Medal (beating Australia's David Palmer in the final), and another men's doubles Gold Medal (partnering Beachill again).

Other career highlights included winning three consecutive Super Series Finals titles (1999–2001), two PSA Masters titles (2000 & 2004), three Tournament of Champions titles (2001 & 2003-4), and two British National Championship titles (1996 & 2003).

Retirement
In July 2006, Nicol announced that he would be retiring after the 2006 World Open in September. Nicol's final match was a loss to Thierry Lincou in the quarter-finals.

Nicol turned his focus to promoting the game, providing sponsorship, support and coaching through his company Peter Nicol Squash, and promoting events worldwide through Eventis Sports Marketing Ltd. Following a move to the United States, he set up the Nicol Champions Academy in New York and co-founded SquashSkills, an online coaching resource aimed at delivering squash coaching from many of the world's top players.

World Open final appearances

British Open final appearances

Commonwealth Games final appearances 

Nicol also won men's doubles Gold Medals at the Commonwealth Games in 2002 and 2006 (partnering Lee Beachill on both occasions).

References

External links
 
 
 Page at Squashpics.com
 Article regarding Nicol's switch from Scotland to England
 Article on the announcement of Nicol's retirement
 Article on Nicol's retirement
 BBC article on the announcement of Nicol's retirement

1973 births
Living people
English male squash players
Scottish male squash players
Commonwealth Games medallists in squash
Commonwealth Games gold medallists for England
Commonwealth Games gold medallists for Scotland
Commonwealth Games silver medallists for England
Commonwealth Games bronze medallists for Scotland
Members of the Order of the British Empire
Squash players at the 1998 Commonwealth Games
Squash players at the 2002 Commonwealth Games
Squash players at the 2006 Commonwealth Games
World Games gold medalists
Competitors at the 2005 World Games
People from Inverurie
Anglo-Scots
Sportspeople from Aberdeenshire
Medallists at the 1998 Commonwealth Games
Medallists at the 2002 Commonwealth Games
Medallists at the 2006 Commonwealth Games